Ntwenhle High School is a public state secondary school in the Golokodo area of Folweni in the province of KwaZulu-Natal, South Africa. It is located south west of Durban.

References

Schools in KwaZulu-Natal
High schools in South Africa